The Charlatan is an 1898 American operetta also known as The Mystical Miss, with music and lyrics by John Philip Sousa. Today only excerpts from the work—"The Charlatan March", "The Charlatan Waltzes" and "The Charlatan Overture"—are commonly known.

Production
The Charlatan is a comic opera in three acts, with a book by Charles Klein and music by John Philip Sousa. It was written for the DeWolf Hopper Opera Company, which presented the work for the first time on August 29, 1898. Directed by H. A. Cripps, the Broadway production ran September 8 – October 8, 1898, at the Knickerbocker Theatre in New York City.

Cast
 DeWolf Hopper as Demidoff
 Edmund Stanley as Prince Boris
 Mark M. Price as Gogol
 Alfred Klein as Jelikoff
 George W. Barnum as Captain Peshofki
 Arthur Cunningham as the Grand Duke
 Harry P. Stone as Kofeff
 C. Arthur as Skobeloff
 Nella Bergen as Anna
 Alice Judson as Katrinka
 Katherine Carlisle as Sophia
 Adine Bouviere as the Grand Duchess

After a profitable tour, The Charlatan was reprised on Broadway beginning May 4, 1899, at the Fifth Avenue Theatre. Hopper and his wife Nella Bergen starred in the operetta—titled The Mystical Miss—at the Comedy Theatre in London beginning December 13, 1899.

References

External links
 The Charlatan at the Internet Broadway Database

1898 musicals
Broadway musicals
Compositions by John Philip Sousa